David Burkette is an American politician who represented Alabama's 26th Senate district in the Alabama Senate as a Democrat from 2018 to 2020. He resigned in 2020 after being convicted of campaign violation charges, he was succeeded in a special election by Kirk Hatcher.

Career
Burkette previously served as a member of the Montgomery City Council. He is also a retired educator.

In 2017, Burkette filed to run for the Senate seat vacated by Quinton Ross, who resigned to become president of Alabama State University. Burkette won the special election after winning the Democratic nomination. He ran again in the general election, winning re-election.

Burkette resigned from the Senate on September 1, 2020 facing investigations over campaign finance violations. On September 3, he was charged with depositing $3,625 in campaign contributions into his personal account while running for Montgomery City Council in 2015 and 2016.

In 2020 he was convicted of campaign violations.

Electoral history

References

Alabama state senators
Living people
Year of birth missing (living people)
Alabama politicians convicted of crimes